The main recurring characters in the TV series Spooks include (principals shown in bold):

Final Series Leads
Main characters for Series 10:
 Sir Harry Pearce KBE (Peter Firth) (2002-2011) - Head of Counter-Terrorism Department, MI5.
 Dimitri Levendis (Max Brown) (2010-2011) Piracy and Terrorism Case Officer Section D 
 Erin Watts (Lara Pulver) (2011) - Chief of Section & Senior Case Officer, Section D
 Calum Reed (Geoffrey Streatfeild) (2011) - Junior Case Officer, Section D
 William Towers (Simon Russell Beale; 2010-2011) Home Secretary.
 Ruth Evershed (Nicola Walker) (2003–2006, 2009-2011) - Section D Intelligence Analyst, Home Secretary's Assistant (episodes 10.5/.6), originally seconded to MI5 from GCHQ).

Former characters

MI5 staff
Tariq Masood (Shazad Latif) (2009-2011) - Technician and Data Analyst, Section D
 Beth Bailey (Sophia Myles) (2010) Formerly Junior Case Officer Section D 
Lucas North (Richard Armitage) (2008–2010) Chief of Section & Senior Case Officer, Section D.
Ros Myers (Hermione Norris) (2006–2009) - Chief of Section & Senior Case Officer, Section D, formerly Senior Case Officer at MI5 and MI6.
Jo Portman  (Miranda Raison) (2005–2009) - Junior Case Officer, Section D.
Malcolm Wynn-Jones (Hugh Simon) (2002–2009, 2010-) - Technician and Data Analyst, Section D.
Adam Carter (Rupert Penry-Jones) (2004–2008) - Chief of Section & Senior Case Officer, Section D, formerly Senior Case Officer at MI6
Connie James (Gemma Jones) (2007–2008) - Senior Analyst, Section D.
Ben Kaplan DSO (Alex Lanipekun) (2007–2008) - Junior Case Officer, Section D.
Zafar Younis (Raza Jaffrey) (2004–2007) - Junior Case Officer, Section D.
Colin Wells (Rory MacGregor) (2002–2006) - Technician and Data Analyst, Section D.
Sam Buxton (Shauna Macdonald) (2003–2005) - Administrative Officer, Section D.
Fiona Carter (Olga Sosnovska) (2004–2005) - Seconded MI6 Officer, Section D.
Zoe Reynolds (Keeley Hawes) (2002–2004) - Junior Case Officer, Section D.
Tom Quinn (Matthew Macfadyen) (2002–2004) - Chief of Section & Senior Case Officer, Section D.
Danny Hunter (David Oyelowo) (2002–2004) - Junior Case Officer, Section D.
Tessa Phillips (Jenny Agutter) (2002–2003) - Senior Analyst.
Jed Kelley (Graeme Mearns) (2002) - Administrative Officer, Section D.
Helen Flynn (Lisa Faulkner) (2002) - Junior Case Officer, Section D.

Other officers
Vaughn Edwards (Iain Glen) (2010) - Deniable intelligence operative who seemed to work for the highest bidder.
Sarah Caulfield (Genevieve O'Reilly) (2009) - CIA Agent.
Viktor Sarkisian (Peter Sullivan) (2008–2009) - Head of the FSB's London Office
Bob Hogan (Matthew Marsh) (2007) - Senior CIA Liaison to Britain.
Oliver Mace (Tim McInnerny) (2004, 2006) - Chairman of the Joint Intelligence Committee, later Director-General of MI5.
Juliet Shaw (Anna Chancellor) (2005-) - National Security Co-Ordinator. Status uncertain following end of Series 6.
Christine Dale (Megan Dodds) (2002–2004) - CIA Agent.
Jools Siviter (Hugh Laurie) (2002) - MI6 Section Chief.

Significant others
Maya Lahan (Laila Rouass) (2010) Lucas's Ex Girlfriend.
Elizabeta Starkova (Paloma Baeza) (2008) - Lucas North's ex-wife
Will North (Richard Harrington) (2004) - Zoe Reynolds' fiancé.
Ellie Simm (Esther Hall) (2002–2003) - Tom Quinn's ex-girlfriend.
Vicki Westbrook (Natasha Little) (2003) - Tom Quinn's ex-girlfriend.
Carlo Franceschini (Enzo Cilenti) (2003) - Zoe Reynolds' ex-boyfriend.

UK Ministers
These fictional UK cabinet ministers managed the team or have been characters in some episodes.
Nicholas Blake - Home Secretary - (Robert Glenister) (2006–2009) killed 2010
Rachel Beauchamp - Foreign Secretary - (Jill Baker) (Series 7, Episode 6)
Gillian Calderwood - Chancellor of the Exchequer - (Selina Cadell) (Series 7, Episode 5)
Caroline Fox - Deputy Prime Minister - (Cheryl Campbell) (Series 5, Episode 10)
James Allan - Foreign Secretary - (Alex Jennings) (2006)
Ruth Chambers - Foreign Secretary - (Angela Bruce) (2007)
unnamed Home Secretary - (Jeff Rawle) (2005)
Alan Taylor - Cabinet Secretary - (2006)
Richard Maynard - Defence Secretary - mentioned but resigned later.
Daniel Wise - Foreign Trade Minister - (Ian Bartholomew) (2006)
Andrew Lawrence - Home Secretary - (Tobias Menzies) (2009) 
William Towers - Home Secretary - (Simon Russell Beale) (2010-2011)

Other guest stars

Series 1
Anthony Head - Traitor's Gate (1#4)
Tim Pigott-Smith - (1#5)

Series 2
Alexander Siddig - Series 2, Episode 2

Series 3
Anton Lesser - Series 3, Episode 4
Andy Serkis - Series 3, Episode 8

Series 4
Martine McCutcheon - Series 4, Episode 2
Andrew Tiernan - Surreal World and The Possibility of a Mole (4#1 and 4#2)
Jimi Mistry - Series 4, Episode 6

Series 5

Gugu Mbatha-Raw as Jenny

Series 6

Series 7
Paul Rhys as Alexis Meynell - Episode 5

Timeline

References

Spooks
Spooks
Spooks (TV series)